sintu may refer to: 
SiNtu, is a languages group, see Southern Bantu languages
Sintu Manjezi (born 1996), South African rugby union player